is a Japanese actor and voice actor from Chiba Prefecture. He is affiliated with Arts Vision. He is best known for his roles in Bleach (as Ganju Shiba), Detective Conan (as Genta Kojima and Wataru Takagi), After War Gundam X (as Garrod Ran), Slayers Try (as Valgaav), the Beast Wars: Transformers series (as Cheetor), Great Teacher Onizuka (as Eikichi Onizuka), Hajime no Ippo (as Masaru Aoki), Naruto (as Obito Uchiha), the fifth series of GeGeGe no Kitarō (as Nezumi Otoko), Yes! PreCure 5 (as Bunbee),  and more recently, JoJo's Bizarre Adventure: Diamond Is Unbreakable (as Okuyasu Nijimura). Takagi is the official Japanese voice of Daffy Duck.

Career
He was a member of Katsuta Voice Actor's Academy.

In 2014, he performed the voice of John H. Watson in the puppetry Sherlock Holmes written by Kōki Mitani. 2 years later, he played Oyamada Shigemasa in the NHK Taiga drama Sanada Maru through Mitani's connection. It was his first appearance in a television drama.

Filmography

Anime

Video games

Television drama

Tokusatsu

Drama CDs

Dubbing roles

Live-action

Animation

References

External links
 Official agency profile 
 San-nin no Kai website (archive) 
 

1966 births
Living people
Arts Vision voice actors
Japanese male video game actors
Japanese male voice actors
Male voice actors from Chiba Prefecture
20th-century Japanese male actors
21st-century Japanese male actors